A gubernatorial election was held on 2 June 2019 to elect the next governor of Aomori.

Candidates 
Shingo Mimura* back by LDP and Komeito.
Wakako Sahara back by the opposition parties CDP, JCP, SDP, DPFP.

Results

References 

Gubernatorial elections in Japan
2019 elections in Japan
Politics of Aomori Prefecture